The 2008 UNAF U-17 Tournament was the third edition of the UNAF U-17 Tournament. It took place in March 2008 in Tunisia. Tunisia won the tournament after topping the round robin competition.

Participants

Tournament

Champions

References

2008 in African football
2008
2008
2007–08 in Algerian football
2007–08 in Tunisian football
2007–08 in Libyan football
2007–08 in Moroccan football